Line 1 of the Dongguan Rail Transit,, is a rapid transit line under construction in Dongguan, Guangdong. It has a planned 25 stations and connect Machongxi in the North, to Huangjiangnan in the south.

The Phase 1 of Line 1 in Dongguan will start construction in September 2018. The extension to Huangpu Passenger Port have not approved by National Development and Reform Commission and has no published timeline.

Stations

List of planned lines
Line 1
Line 2
Line 3
Line 4

See also
 Guangzhou Metro
 FMetro
 Shenzhen Metro
 List of rapid transit systems
 Metro systems by annual passenger rides

References

External links
 Dongguan Rail Transit – official website 

Dongguan Rail Transit lines
Transport infrastructure under construction in China